
Year 448 (CDXLVIII) was a leap year starting on Thursday (link will display the full calendar) of the Julian calendar. At the time, it was known as the Year of the Consulship of Praetextatus and Zeno (or, less frequently, year 1201 Ab urbe condita). The denomination 448 for this year has been used since the early medieval period, when the Anno Domini calendar era became the prevalent method in Europe for naming years.

Events 
 By place 

 Byzantium 
This depopulated buffer zone deprives the Romans of their natural defensive advantages.
 Theodosius II orders all non-Christian books burned.

 Europe 
 Flavius Aetius suppresses the Bagaudae in Armorica (Gaul), and defeats the Salian Franks under King Chlodio near Arras (Belgica Secunda); the invaders are stopped around a river-crossing near Vicus Helena.
 Rechiar succeeds his father Rechila as king of the Suebi in Galicia (Northern Spain). He marries a daughter of the Visigoth king Theodoric I and converts to Catholicism. 

 China 
 Kou Qianzhi, Chinese Daoist reformer, dies after having converted emperor Taiwu of Northern Wei and having established Daoism as the country's dominant religion. His death presages a revival of Buddhism as China's dominant faith. 

 By topic 

 Religion 
 Eutyches is accused of heresy at a synod held in Constantinople.

Births 
 Cyriacus of Athens, Greek anchorite and saint (d. 557)

Deaths 
 Kou Qianzhi, Chinese high official and Daoist (b. 365) 
 Rechila, king of the Suebi (approximate date)
 Saint Germanus, bishop of Auxerre (approximate date)

References